Ayşe Tekdal (born 28 October 1999) is a Turkish female race walker specialising in the 5000 m, 10,000 m and 20 km events. She is a native of Diyarbakır, southeastern Turkey. She competes for Kayapınar Belediyespor in her hometown.

Sports career
Tekdal won the silver nedal in the 5,000 m event at the 2016 European Athletics Youth Championships held in Tbilisi, Georgia with a personal best time of 22:58.17 behind her countrywoman Meryem Bekmez. At the 2018 IAAF World Race Walking Team Championships in Taicang, China, she took the bronze medal in the 10 km race walk event with her teammate Bekmez. In 2019, she captured the gold medal in the 20 km race walk event of the European Athletics U23 Championships held in Gävle, Sweden. In 2019, she competed in the women's 20 kilometres walk event at the 2019 World Athletics Championships held in Doha, Qatar. She was disqualified after a fourth red card. In She set a new Turkish U23 and seniors record with 21:00.97 in the indoor 5,000 m race walking event at the Turkish Indoor Race Walking Championship  on 17 January 2021. Former senior women's record was held by Meryem Bekmez with 21:54.25 set in 2018, and the women's U23 record was of Nergis Adaş.

In 2021, she won the gold medal at the Balkan Race Walk Championship in Antalya, Turkey with a time of 1:30:12, which brought her the participation at the 2020 Summer Olympics. She became the first Balkan champion Turkish woman race walker.

Competition record

 PB: Personal best

References

External links

Living people
1999 births
Sportspeople from Diyarbakır
Turkish female racewalkers
Athletes (track and field) at the 2020 Summer Olympics
Olympic athletes of Turkey
Olympic female racewalkers